The Marriage Act 1949 (12, 13 & 14 Geo 6 c 76) is an Act of the Parliament of the United Kingdom regulating marriages in England and Wales.

The Act had prohibited solemnizing marriages during evenings and at night. Since the Marriage Act 1836 it had been forbidden to marry between the hours of six in the evening and eight in the morning. This prohibition was repealed on 1 October 2012.

The Marriage Act 1949 was the first Act to be enacted under the Consolidation of Enactments (Procedure) Act 1949.

Section 1 - Marriages within prohibited degrees
Section 1 marriages of persons within the prohibited degrees of relationships listed in the schedule are void.

The prohibited relationships were based the Table of Kindred and Affinity which had been included in the Book of Common Prayer of the Church of England since 1662. The list included parents, grandparents, children,  grandchildren, siblings, aunts and uncles, nieces and nephews, as well as a number of affinity relationships. The Children Act 1975 added adoptive parents and children, and former adoptive parents and children to the prohibited list. The list was significantly changed, especially by the Marriage (Prohibited Degrees of Relationship) Act 1986, which removed affinity relationships from the list and made other changes.

Section 2 - Marriages of persons under sixteen
This section re-enacts section 1 of the Age of Marriage Act 1929 which set the minimum marriage age at 16 with consent of parents or guardians and 21 (since lowered to 18) without that consent. Marriages contracted by persons either of whom is under the age of 16 years are void. Before 1929, the common law and canon law applied so that a person who had attained the legal age of puberty could contract a valid marriage. A marriage contracted by persons either of whom was under the legal age of puberty was voidable. The legal age of puberty was 14 for males and 12 for females.

In 1971, Eekelaar wrote that the prohibition now contained in this section "though desirable, is extreme and inflexible." According to him it could result in "genuine hardship", such as where it is discovered, after years of apparent marriage, that a mistake was made, at the time of the ceremony, regarding the age of one of the spouses, or where one of the spouses concealed their real age, though, after 1971, some protection was afforded by section 6 of the Law Reform (Miscellaneous Provisions) Act 1970 (now repealed and replaced by the Inheritance (Provision for Family and Dependants) Act 1975).

Section 4 - Hours for solemnization of marriages
Originally, a marriage had to be solemnized between 8am and 6pm. The section was repealed by the Protection of Freedoms Act 2012.

Section 75 - Offences relating to solemnization of marriages
Section 75(1)(a) was repealed by the Protection of Freedoms Act 2012.

Royal family
The wedding of Charles, Prince of Wales and Camilla Parker Bowles in 2005 brought into question whether civil marriages were available to members of the British royal family. Lord Falconer, the Lord Chancellor, replied to the House of Lords that in his opinion the marriage was in accordance with the 1949 Act.

See also
Ahkter v Khan
Marriage in England and Wales

References

Bibliography
J C Arnold. The Marriage Law of England. Staples Press. 1951. Chapter V and Appendix.

External links

United Kingdom Acts of Parliament 1949
Marriage law in the United Kingdom